Beechwood–Brookline station is a SEPTA rapid transit station in Haverford Township, Pennsylvania. It serves the Norristown High Speed Line and is located at Edgewood and Strathmore Roads, although SEPTA gives the address as Beechwood and Karakung Drives. Both local trains and Hughes Park Express trains stop at Beechwood–Brookline. The station has off-street parking available.

Station layout

History
Beechwood Park opened in 1907 as the first stop north of the Philadelphia and Western Railroad southern terminus. The railroad opened Beechwood Amusement Park adjacent to the site to attract patrons, but it only operated until 1909. The remnants are within sight of the station.

References

External links

 Karakung Drive entrance from Google Maps Street View
 I Live in Harford: Beechwood — includes pictures of original P&W station

SEPTA Norristown High Speed Line stations
Railway stations in the United States opened in 1907